Sachin Rana (born 18 September 1984 in Gurgaon, Haryana) is an Indian cricketer. He made his List A debut in 2003-04 and his First Class debut in 2004–05; he has since played for Haryana, the Kolkata Knight Riders, North Zone and Pune Warriors India as a right-handed middle order batsman. He made his Twenty20 debut against the Punjab team in 2007, and he played for the Pune Warriors India in the IPL 2011 season. He played for Sunrisers Hyderabad in the IPL 2013 season and for RCB in IPL 2014.

References

External links
 

Indian cricketers
North Zone cricketers
Living people
People from Gurgaon
Kolkata Knight Riders cricketers
Pune Warriors India cricketers
Haryana cricketers
Royal Challengers Bangalore cricketers
Prime Bank Cricket Club cricketers
1984 births